"Just Don't Want to Be Lonely" is a song written by Bobby Eli, John Freeman and Vinnie Barrett, originally recorded in 1973 by Ronnie Dyson and popularized internationally by The Main Ingredient. Dyson's version reached No. 60 in the US Pop chart, No. 30 Adult Contemporary, and No. 29 in the US R&B chart. Its flipside was "Point of No Return", a song written by Thom Bell & Linda Creed.

Chart history

The Main Ingredient cover
The Main Ingredient's version of the song was released in 1974 on RCA Victor and reached No.10 in the US, No.8 in US R&B and No.42 in US AC. It reached No.7 in Canada.  The recording was arranged by Bert de Coteaux.  It became a gold record.

Chart history

Weekly charts

Year-end charts

Other cover versions
 Freddie McGregor recorded the song in a reggae version and released it in 1987. The track had Robbie Lyn on keyboards, synthesizer and Oberheim DMX programming and Dean Frazer on saxophone. Errol Thompson engineered and it was produced by Donovan Germain.  McGregor's version reached No.9 in the UK.
In 1996, Filipino singer Regine Velasquez included it on her album Retro.
 Other artists who delivered versions include Horace Andy, The Blues Busters, Little John, Marcia Griffiths, Sanchez, Livingston Taylor and Blue Magic.

References

1973 songs
1973 singles
1974 singles
1987 singles
Songs written by Vinnie Barrett
Songs written by Bobby Eli
Ronnie Dyson songs
The Main Ingredient (band) songs
Blue Magic (band) songs
Columbia Records singles
RCA Victor singles